Gary Moya (born 23 October 2001) is a Chilean footballer who is currently playing as a midfielder for Everton de Viña del Mar.

External links
 

2001 births
Living people
Chilean footballers
Chilean Primera División players
Everton de Viña del Mar footballers
Association football midfielders